Sara Harstick (born 8 September 1981 in Hildesheim, Niedersachsen) is a former German freestyle swimmer, who won bronze medals in the 2000 and 2004 Summer Olympics.

Also in 2004 in Athens, she swam in her only individual Olympic race, finishing sixth in the fifth heat of the 200 m freestyle, one spot short of advancing to the semifinals. A few months before the 2008 Summer Olympics, Harstick ended her swimming career after the firing of her coach, Rainer Tylinski.

References

German female swimmers
Olympic swimmers of Germany
Living people
1981 births
Olympic bronze medalists for Germany
Swimmers at the 2000 Summer Olympics
Swimmers at the 2004 Summer Olympics
Olympic bronze medalists in swimming
German female freestyle swimmers
World Aquatics Championships medalists in swimming
Medalists at the 2004 Summer Olympics
Medalists at the 2000 Summer Olympics
Sportspeople from Hildesheim
20th-century German women
21st-century German women